AlMasria Universal Airlines (also known as AlMasria Airlines) is an Egyptian private airline based in Egypt. The airline operates scheduled and charter services from Egypt. 'AlMasria' is derived from the Arabic word for 'Egyptian'.

Operations 
Plans for AlMasria Universal Airlines were announced in 2008 and the airline launched operations in June 2009. In an interview in April 2009 the appointed company president and CEO, Hassan Aziz stated that the airline would launch operations in 2009 to take advantage of low prices during the global financial crisis to tap demand for air travel in the most populous Arab country. The first aircraft arrived in Egypt in April 2009 and the second one in August 2009. Both aircraft are leased from BOC Aviation. The airline's CEO stated the plans call for a further 3 A320 will join during the first year of operation. An eventual fleet of 10 aircraft is planned by 2014. "We aim to dry-lease the first aircraft for the first three years", says Aziz. "After five years we aim to buy aircraft from Airbus by 2014. We don't want to load the balance sheet by buying $250 million in assets at the start."

In December 2009 the airline became the first international airline to operate flights to Saudi Arabia's Yanbu Airport. In June 2010 the airline repeated the milestone at Qassim Regional Airport. Previously both Yanbu and Qassim airports were domestic airports. Both flights originate from Cairo International Airport. The company also offers cargo services in the bellyhold of its passenger fleet. Maintenance is outsourced completely to Egyptair under a total service agreement, with the airline also training AlMasria flight crew and the technical team. Ground-handling will be through Egyptair, with passenger services undertaken by Egypt Aviation Services and catering by a new venture between Egyptair and Lufthansa's LSG Sky Chefs.

In 2017, the airline scaled back scheduled operations and resumed charter services and ACMI operations (including Tunis Air).

Destinations 
The AlMasria Universal Airlines route network consists of the following destinations:

Fleet

As of February 2020, The AlMasria Universal Airlines fleet consists of the following aircraft:

References

 https://web.archive.org/web/20101106100638/http://www.eyeofdubai.com/v1/news/newsdetail-29831.htm

External links

 Official website

Airlines of Egypt
Airlines established in 2008
Companies based in Cairo
Egyptian companies established in 2008